David Eaton may refer to:

 David Eaton (composer) (born 1949), American composer
 David Eaton (cricketer) (1934–2012), South African cricketer
 David Eaton (footballer) (born 1981), English footballer
 David Eaton (gymnast) (born 1980), Welsh gymnast
 David Hilliard Eaton (1932–1992), American Unitarian minister